Miroslav Marković (born 4 November 1989) is a Serbian football player who plays as forward.

Club career
He signed a three-year contract with Dukla Prague in June 2011 after scoring 17 goals in the 2010–11 Czech 2. Liga while on loan at Viktoria Žižkov.

In July 2012, Marković headed to Dynamo České Budějovice on a loan deal. In January 2013, he finished his loan and moved to Zbrojovka Brno, where he signed a two-and-a-half-year contract.

On 5 August 2017, he signed with the Russian Premier League club SKA Khabarovsk.

On 16 July 2018 he signed with Moroccan side Hassania Agadir and become first Serbian player ever in Botola.

Career statistics

References

External links

1989 births
Living people
Serbian footballers
Serbian expatriate footballers
FC Zbrojovka Brno players
FC Baník Ostrava players
FK Čáslav players
FC Sellier & Bellot Vlašim players
FK Dukla Prague players
MFK Ružomberok players
SK Dynamo České Budějovice players
AEL Kalloni F.C. players
FC Slovan Liberec players
FC SKA-Khabarovsk players
Bohemians 1905 players
Hassania Agadir players
FK Inđija players
FC Baltika Kaliningrad players
Czech First League players
Super League Greece players
Botola players
Czech National Football League players
Slovenian Second League players
Russian Premier League players
Slovak Super Liga players
Association football forwards
Expatriate footballers in Slovenia
Expatriate footballers in Slovakia
Expatriate footballers in the Czech Republic
Expatriate footballers in Morocco
Expatriate footballers in Uzbekistan
Expatriate footballers in Russia
Expatriate footballers in Greece
Serbian expatriate sportspeople in Slovenia
Serbian expatriate sportspeople in Slovakia
Serbian expatriate sportspeople in the Czech Republic
Serbian expatriate sportspeople in Morocco
Serbian expatriate sportspeople in Russia
Serbian expatriate sportspeople in Greece
People from Aranđelovac